Asiracinae is a subfamily of delphacid planthoppers in the family Delphacidae. There are at least 30 genera and 180 described species in Asiracinae, which probably has a world-wide distribution.

Genera
These 31 genera belong to the subfamily Asiracinae:

 Asiraca Latreille, 1796 i c g
 Canyra Stål, 1862 i c g
 Copicerus Swartz, 1802 i c g b
 Elaphodelphax Fennah, 1949 i c g
 Eodelphax Kirkaldy, 1901 i c g
 Equasystatus Asche, 1983 i c g
 Fennasiraca Asche, 1985 i c g
 Hainanaella Qin and Zhang, 2007 i c g
 Idiosemus Berg, 1883 i c g
 Idiosystatus Berg, 1883 i c g
 Kiambrama Donaldson, 1988 i c g
 Livatiella Fennah, 1956 i c g
 Melanesia Kirkaldy, 1907 i c g
 Melanugyops Fennah, 1956 i c g
 Neopunana Asche, 1983 i c g
 Notuchoides Donaldson, 1988 i c g
 Notuchus Fennah, 1969 i c g
 Ostama Walker, 1857 i c g
 Paralivatiella Qin and Zhang, 2010 i c g
 Paranda Melichar, 1903 i c g
 Parapunana Chen and Hou, 2012 i c g
 Pentagramma Van Duzee, 1897 i c g b
 Pentasteira Barringer and Bartlett, 2011 i c g
 Perimececera Muir, 1913 i c g
 Platysystatus Muir, 1930 i c g
 Prolivatis Emeljanov, 1995 i c g
 Punana Muir, 1913 i c g
 Serafinana Gebicki and Szwedo, 2000 i c g
 Tetrasteira Muir, 1926 i c g
 Ugyopana Fennah, 1950 i c g
 Ugyops Guérin-Méneville, 1834 i c g

Data sources: i = ITIS, c = Catalogue of Life, g = GBIF, b = Bugguide.net

References

Further reading

External links

 

 
Delphacidae
Hemiptera subfamilies